West Harlem may refer to:
 An area of Harlem, New York
Hamilton Heights, Manhattan, a neighborhood in that area
Manhattanville, Manhattan, a neighborhood in that area
Morningside Heights, Manhattan, a neighborhood in that area
 West Harlem Art Fund, a public art and preservation organization
 West Harlem Environmental Action, an environmental organization